海山, meaning "sea (and) mountain", may refer to:

Hai San Secret Society, 19th-century organisation based in Penang
One of the Chinese names of Külüg Khan, third Emperor of China's Yuan Dynasty
Haishan metro station, Taipei Rapid Transit System, Taiwan
Haishan Subdistrict, a subdistrict of Yantian District, Shenzhen, China
Haishan, a subdivision of Jiefang Subdistrict, Zhoushan, China
Miyama, Mie, former town in Japan
Montane Mansion (海山樓), in Hong Kong